Pune (पुणे, formerly spelt Poona) Lok Sabha constituency is one of the 48 Lok Sabha (parliamentary) constituencies in Maharashtra state in western India.

Vidhan Sabha segments
The six vidhan sabha seats covered by Pune (पुणे) constituency have been frequently rearranged due to changing demography and population explosion in the area. Seats like Shukrawar Peth (1962-1977), Bhawani Peth no longer exist. Presently, Pune Lok Sabha constituency comprises six Vidhan Sabha (legislative assembly) segments. These segments are:

Members of Lok Sabha

Election results

1957 Lok Sabha
 Narayan Goray (PSP) : 143,822 votes 
 Gadgil, Narhar Vishnu (INC) : 99,586

1980 Lok Sabha
 Gadgil Vithalrao Narhari (विठ्ठलराव गाडगीळ) (INC) : 215,161 votes 
 Nana Sahib Goray (नानासाहेब गोरे) (JNP) : 186,331

1984 Lok Sabha
 Gadgil Vithalrao Narhari (INC) : 311,278 votes 
 Jagannath-rao Joshi (BJP) : 112,924

1999 Lok Sabha

2004 Lok Sabha

2009

2014

2019 Lok Sabha

See also
 Pune district
 List of Constituencies of the Lok Sabha

Notes

References

External links
Pune lok sabha  constituency election 2019 results details

Lok Sabha constituencies in Maharashtra
Politics of Pune district
Pune